is a vertically scrolling shooter game developed by Toaplan and released for arcades in 1985. It was published in Japan by Taito and in North America by Romstar. Controlling the titular attack helicopter, the player must fight endless waves of military vehicles while avoiding collision with their projectiles and other obstacles. The Tiger-Heli has a powerful bomb at its disposal that can clear the screen of enemies when fired. It was the first shoot 'em up game from Toaplan, and their third video game overall.

Tiger-Heli was the creation of video game composers Masahiro Yuge and Tatsuya Uemura, who had previously worked on several titles for Japanese companies Orca and Crux before both of them declared bankruptcy. The development team drew inspiration from the arcade game Gyrodine. The team wanted to create a scrolling shooter that balanced between being entertaining and fun, and to have players keep wanting to play it after dying. The staff chose a helicopter as the player's craft as they felt it would work for a game that had the screen continuously scrolling. The soundtrack, composed by Uemura, was made to convey a sense of bravery, which was hampered by technical limitations.

Tiger-Heli was well received by critics for its gameplay, graphics and weapons, and helped establish Toaplan as a leading producer of shooting games throughout the 1980s and 1990s. It was ported to the Nintendo Entertainment System by Micronics, a conversion that was commended for its accurate portrayal of the arcade original. The NES version sold over one million copies. A PlayStation version was released in 1996 by Banpresto as part of the compilation Toaplan Shooting Battle 1. It was followed by two sequels: Twin Cobra (1987), and Twin Cobra II (1995). The rights to Tiger-Heli are owned by Tatsujin, a Japanese developer formed by Yuge. In 2021, the game was released exclusively in Japan for the PlayStation 4 and Nintendo Switch as part of the Toaplan Arcade Garage compilation.

Gameplay 

Tiger-Heli is a military-themed vertically scrolling shoot 'em up game, in which players take control of the titular attack helicopter through four increasingly difficult levels in order to defeat an assortment of military enemy forces like tanks, battleships, and artillery as the main objective. Besides some airplanes taking off, there are no flying enemies in the entire game. As far as vertical scrolling shooters go, the title initially appears to be very standard, as players control their craft over a constantly scrolling background and the scenery never stops moving until a helipad is reached. Players have only two weapons at their disposal: the standard shot that travels a max distance of half the screen's height and two bombs.

A unique gameplay feature is the bomb mechanic; unlike other games in the genre released at the time, the bombs are powerful weapons capable of obliterating any enemy caught within its blast radius. The bombs also act as a shield against incoming enemy fire, however, as they can be triggered after taking enemy hits as well. There are also three types of items scattered through every stage in total that appear as destructible flashing crosses: extra bomb stocks and two variations of helicopter "options" that attack at the player's will against incoming enemies, while is also possible to mix and match the two helicopter option types, totaling no more than two. These items can be picked up by shooting their respective cross color but grabbing any item when not necessary yields bonus points.

Players are given three lives initially and bonus lives are awarded by reaching certain score thresholds or collecting ten gold diamonds in a row by shooting them. Firing on determined locations is also crucial for reaching high-scores to obtain extra lives, as certain setpieces in some stages hosts a bonus secret within their scenery. There are also hidden bonus secrets to be found as well. The game employs a checkpoint system in which a downed single player will start off at the beginning of the checkpoint they managed to reach before dying. Getting hit by enemy fire will result in losing a life, as well as the helicopter options and once all lives are lost, the game is over unless the player inserts more credits into the arcade machine to continue playing. After completing the last stage, the game begins again with the second loop increasing in difficulty and enemies fire denser bullet patterns.

Development 
Tiger-Heli was created under the working title Cobra by most of the same team that previously worked on several projects at Orca and Crux before both companies declared bankruptcy, after which a group of employees from the two gaming divisions would go on to form Toaplan and among them were composers Masahiro Yuge and Tatsuya Uemura, both of which recounted the project's development process and history between 1989 and 2012 through various Japanese publications. The team wanted to create a game that balanced frustrating and entertaining sections, as well as inciting audiences to keep playing after losing a live and progress further, though the idea of playing as a helicopter was influenced by Gyrodine because the team felt it could work as a shoot 'em up title where the screen kept scrolling.

When creating the artwork for Tiger-Heli, which has been described as "polygonal" in recent interviews, Toaplan was realizing research for a possible flight simulator they could develop themselves and one of the project's designers implemented a sample image from the simulator into the game. The concept of using a bomb in a shoot 'em up game came up during development, where the team questioned how to make the title more engaging for players but it was never intended for defensive purposes according to them, as the mechanic was instead implemented to provide an aggressive feeling against enemies during difficult situations in the title. Several other features were integrated into the project as a way to keep audiences playing such as the continuous stage scrolling during the high score screen, which was akin to a drama. According to Uemura, development was financed with the team's own funds, as Taito solely focused on distribution and Toaplan's name could not be displayed in the game due to contractual arrangements.

The soundtrack was composed by Uemura, who also created the sound effects. When writing the music during development, Uemura intended the songs to convey a sense of bravery but he was limited due to technical and memory restrictions at the time of release.

Release 
Tiger-Heli was released in arcades across Japan and North America in October 1985 by Taito and Romstar. On 21 November 1988, an album containing music from the title and its sequel was co-published exclusively in Japan by Scitron and Pony Canyon.

On 5 December 1986, a Nintendo Entertainment System port of Tiger-Heli developed by Micronics was first released in Japan by Pony Canyon. It was then released in North America in September 1987 by Acclaim Entertainment, who also distributed the title across Europe in January 1990. This version was also released in South Korea by Hyundai Electronics in 1987. Both the original arcade version and the later NES port are similar but have a number of key differences between each other such as the latter having a smaller color palette and lower screen resolution that led to sprites being recolored and the graphics redrawn in different ways, an arranged soundtrack by Masahiro Yuge, among other changes.

On 30 August 1996, Banpresto released a compilation for the PlayStation exclusively in Japan titled Toaplan Shooting Battle 1, which included both arcade versions of Tiger-Heli and its sequel, an arranged soundtrack by Uemura and other additions. In 2021, both the arcade and Nintendo Entertainment System versions were included in the Kyukyoku Tiger-Heli compilation for Nintendo Switch and PlayStation 4 as part of M2's Toaplan Arcade Garage label. Tiger-Heli is planned to be included as part of the Toaplan Arcade 1 compilation for Evercade.

Reception and legacy 

According to Masahiro Yuge, Tiger-Heli proved to be popular in arcades during initial beta location testings. In Japan, Game Machine listed it on their October 1, 1985 issue as being the most popular table arcade game at the time, outperforming titles such as Ghosts 'n Goblins and Gradius.

Den of Geek noted it to be the title from Toaplan which established their gameplay style that would later be refined in the future with other titles, as well as its introduction of a bomb mechanism. Computer Gaming World called Tiger-Heli for the NES an excellent port, and concluded that it was "one of the most exciting arcade shoot-'em-ups to turn up". However, fan reception of the NES conversion in Japan was mixed; in a poll taken by Family Computer Magazine, it received a score of 15.55 out of 30. The NES version sold over one million copies, making it one of the best-selling games for the platform.

Tiger-Heli had two sequels, Twin Cobra and Twin Cobra II. In addition, the titular craft makes an appearance on the Let's! TV Play Classic plug and play game series by SSD Company Limited in Slap Fight Tiger as an alternative craft to the default Leopard space fighter. A game of a similar style titled Tiger Mission was developed in 1987 by Kele Line and published by Status Software across Europe only for the Commodore 64. In more recent years, the rights to the game and many other IPs from Toaplan are now owned by Tatsujin, a company named after Truxton's Japanese title that was founded in 2017 by Yuge, who are now affiliated with arcade manufacturer exA-Arcadia.

Notes

References

External links 
 Tiger-Heli at Killer List of Videogames

1985 video games
Acclaim Entertainment games
Anti-war video games
Arcade video games
Banpresto games
Helicopter video games
Micronics games
Multiplayer and single-player video games
Nintendo Entertainment System games
PlayStation (console) games
Romstar games
Shoot 'em ups
Taito games
Taito arcade games
Toaplan games
Vertically scrolling shooters
Video games developed in Japan
Video game franchises
Video game franchises introduced in 1985
Video games scored by Masahiro Yuge
Video games scored by Tatsuya Uemura